Audun Bakke (16 November 1933 – 26 March 2017) was a Norwegian journalist, lecturer and organizational leader.

Bakke was born in Bergen in west Norway. He studied journalism at the Aarhus University (Denmark), and political science and sociology at the University of Oslo. He was journalist for the newspapers Os- og Fanaposten, Hordaland and Bergens Tidende. His publications include Analytisk journalistikk from 1977, and Kommunaljournalistikk from 1983.

References

1933 births
2017 deaths
Journalists from Bergen
Aarhus University alumni
University of Oslo alumni